, formerly the , opened in 2000 in Kumejima, Okinawa Prefecture, Japan. It displays exhibits relating to the natural and cultural history of Kume Island.

See also
 Okinawa Prefectural Museum
 List of Natural Monuments of Japan (Okinawa)

References

External links
  Kumejima Museum

Kumejima, Okinawa
Museums in Okinawa Prefecture
Museums established in 2000
2000 establishments in Japan